Robinsonekspedisjonen 2013 (also known as Robinson: Paradise vs. Robinson), is the thirteenth season of the Norwegian version of the Swedish show Expedition Robinson. This season premiered in September 2013 and will finish in early December. The main twist this season is that all the contestants have taken part in a reality show prior to this season. Half of the contestants are veterans from previous seasons of Robinson while the other half are from the reality show Paradise Hotel. The contestants will be split into two tribes based on which format they previously took part in.

Finishing order

Voting history

References

External links
(Official Site)

 2013
2013 Norwegian television seasons